Josh Froelich is an American competition shooter who took gold at the 2018 IPSC Shotgun World Shoot in the Open division. Much of his competition shooting has been focused on multigun (3-Gun) and Pistol Caliber Carbine (PCC). He is also a former professional MMA fighter.

See also 
 Kim Leppänen, Finnish sport shooter
 Roberto Vezzoli, Italian sport shooter

References

External links 
 Interview with Josh Froelich, Shotgun World Champion - The practical shooting channel

Year of birth missing (living people)
Living people
IPSC shooters
American male sport shooters
Place of birth missing (living people)
21st-century American people